Jonathan Krane may refer to:

Jonathan A. Krane, American businessman and CEO

Jonathan D. Krane, American screenwriter, movie producer